Fabrice Martin (born 11 September 1986) is a French professional tennis player. He reached a career-high ATP singles ranking of world No. 228 on 23 July 2012, and his highest ATP doubles ranking, world No. 22, on 3 February 2020.

Career

2019: French Open doubles finalist

2020: Top 25 debut, Italian Open finalist

2022: Third ATP 500 doubles final
At the 2022 Astana Open he reached the doubles final with compatriot Adrian Mannarino defeating top seeds Tim Pütz/Michael Venus, and Polish duo Hubert Hurkacz/Jan Zielinski in the semifinals. They lost to Croatian duo and second seeds Nikola Mektic/Mate Pavic in the final.

2023: First ATP 500 title
He won his first ATP 500 doubles title in Dubai with Maxime Cressy defeating third seeds Harri Heliövaara and Lloyd Glasspool.

Significant finals

Grand Slam tournament finals

Doubles: 1 (1 runner-up)

Masters 1000 finals

Doubles: 1 (1 runner-up)

ATP World Tour career finals

Doubles: 21 (8 titles, 13 runner-ups)

Challenger and Futures finals

Singles: 15 (6–9)

Doubles: 54 (31–23)

World TeamTennis
Martin has played four seasons with World TeamTennis, making his debut with the Philadelphia Freedoms in 2016. Martin was named 2016 WTT Male Rookie of the Year playing for the Philadelphia Freedoms. He was tied for first in the league with teammate Naomi Broady in winning percentage in mixed doubles and was also fourth in men's doubles. He played for the Freedoms 2016–2019, and it has been announced that he will be joining the Philadelphia Freedoms during the 2020 WTT season set to begin 12 July.

Martin paired up with Taylor Townsend for mixed doubles and the combination of Taylor Fritz and Donald Young (tennis) in men's doubles. The Freedoms earned the No. 1 seed in WTT Playoffs, but would ultimately fall to the New York Empire, who went on to win the Championship, in the semifinals.

Performance timelines

Doubles

Mixed doubles

References

External links
 
 

1986 births
Living people
French male tennis players
Sportspeople from Bayonne
21st-century French people